Curt Olsberg (born 23 May 1945) is a Swedish former footballer who played as a midfielder.

References

External links

1945 births
Association football midfielders
Swedish footballers
Sweden international footballers
Allsvenskan players
Malmö FF players
Living people
Djurgårdens IF Fotboll players